The 2013 Internationaux de Nouvelle-Calédonie was a professional tennis tournament played on hard courts. It was the tenth edition of the tournament which was part of the 2013 ATP Challenger Tour. It took place in Nouméa, New Caledonia between 31 December 2012 and 6 January 2013.

Singles main-draw entrants

Seeds

 1 Rankings are as of December 24, 2012.

Other entrants
The following players received wildcards into the singles main draw:
  Lucas Pouille
  Jose Statham

The following players received entry from the qualifying draw:
  Maxime Chazal
  Nicolas Ernst
  Nicolas N'Godrela
  Dane Propoggia

Doubles main-draw entrants

Seeds

1 Rankings as of December 24, 2012.

Other entrants
The following pairs received wildcards into the doubles main draw:
  Maxime Chazal /  Nicolas Ernst
  Julien Delaplane /  Nicolas N'Godrela
  Isaac Frost /  Leon Frost

Champions

Singles

 Adrian Mannarino def.  Andrej Martin,  6–4, 6–3

Doubles

 Samuel Groth /  Toshihide Matsui def.  Artem Sitak /  Jose Statham, 7–6(8–6), 1–6, [10–4]

External links
Official Website

Internationaux de Nouvelle-Caledonie
Internationaux de Nouvelle-Calédonie
Inter
Internationaux de Nouvelle-Caledonie